Tinsley White Rucker Jr. (March 24, 1848 – November 18, 1926) was an American politician, soldier and lawyer.

Life 
Rucker was born near Farm Hill, Georgia in Elbert County and attended Princeton College and the Georgia Military Academy. He joined the Confederate Army during the Civil War on March 24, 1864, and served until the war's conclusion.

After the war, Rucker attended the University of Georgia School of Law in Athens where he was a member of the Phi Kappa Literary Society and graduated in 1868. He was admitted to the state bar in 1871 and began practice in Athens.

In 1893, President Grover Cleveland appointed Rucker as assistant United States district attorney for the northern district of Georgia. In 1912, he returned to practicing law in Athens. Upon the death of Georgia's federal representative for the 8th district, Samuel J. Tribble, Rucker won the special election as a Democrat to fill the remainder of the term for that seat in the 64th United States Congress and served from January 11, 1917, until March 3, 1917. He did not seek re-election in 1916 and returned to the practice of law.

Rucker died on November 18, 1926, in Athens, Georgia and was buried in Oconee Hill Cemetery.

References
 Retrieved on 2008-02-14

External links

1848 births
1926 deaths
Princeton University alumni
Georgia (U.S. state) lawyers
Georgia (U.S. state) state court judges
Confederate States Army soldiers
University of Georgia alumni
Democratic Party members of the United States House of Representatives from Georgia (U.S. state)
United States Attorneys for the Northern District of Georgia
19th-century American lawyers